Polyxo (Ancient Greek: Πολυξώ Poluxṓ) is the name of several figures in Greek mythology: 

Polyxo, one of the 3,000 Oceanids, water-nymph daughters of the Titans Oceanus and his sister-wife Tethys.
Polyxo, one of the Hyades.
Polyxo, a Naiad of the river Nile, presumably one of the daughters of the river-god Nilus. She was one of the wives of King Danaus of Libya and bore him twelve daughters: Autonoe, Theano, Electra, Cleopatra, Eurydice, Glaucippe, Anthelea, Cleodora, Euippe, Erato, Stygne, and Bryce. They married twelve sons of King Aegyptus of Egypt and Caliadne, Polyxo's sister, and murdered them on their wedding night. According to Hippostratus, Danaus had all of his progeny by a single woman, Europe, also daughter of Nilus. In some accounts, he married Melia, daughter of his uncle Agenor, king of Tyre.
Polyxo, mother of Antiope and possibly Nycteis by Nycteus.
Polyxo, mother of Actorion. She came to invite Triopas and Erysichthon to her son's wedding, but Erysichthon's mother had to answer that her own son was not coming, as he had been wounded by a boar during hunt. The truth was that Erysichthon was dealing with the insatiable hunger sent upon him by the angry Demeter.
Polyxo, a Lemnian, nurse of Hypsipyle and a seeress. She advised that the Lemnian women conceive children with the Argonauts, as all the men on the island had previously been killed.
Polyxo, a native of Argos, who married Tlepolemus and fled with him to Rhodes. Together they had a son, whose name is not known. Despite being already married, Tlepolemus was later among the suitors of Helen, and thus bound by the oath of Tyndareus, fought in the Trojan War and was killed by Sarpedon, leaving Polyxo to become queen of Rhodes. She received Helen after the latter had been driven out of Sparta by Megapenthes and Nicostratus (Menelaus, Helen's husband, was already dead by the time). Still, Polyxo blamed Helen for Tlepolemus' death and decided to take revenge on her. So when Helen was bathing, several handmaidens in the guise of the Erinyes, sent by Polyxo, seized her and hanged her from a tree. In an alternate version, Menelaus and Helen landed at Rhodes on their way back from Egypt, whereupon Polyxo sent a crowd of armed islanders of both genders against them, hoping to avenge her husband's death on Helen. Menelaus hid Helen away under the deck and had a beautiful servant dressed up as the queen, which resulted in her, and not the real Helen, being killed. Yet another source, which uses the name "Philozoe" rather than "Polyxo", informs that she held funeral games of Tlepolemus; youths competed in them, and the winners were crowned with white poplar leaves.
Polyxo, a Maenad in the retinue of Dionysus who attempted to kill Lycurgus of Thrace.
Polyxo (or Polyzo), a sister of Meleager.

Notes

References 

 Apollodorus, The Library with an English Translation by Sir James George Frazer, F.B.A., F.R.S. in 2 Volumes, Cambridge, MA, Harvard University Press; London, William Heinemann Ltd. 1921. ISBN 0-674-99135-4. Online version at the Perseus Digital Library. Greek text available from the same website.
 Apollonius Rhodius, Argonautica translated by Robert Cooper Seaton (1853-1915), R. C. Loeb Classical Library Volume 001. London, William Heinemann Ltd, 1912. Online version at the Topos Text Project.
 Apollonius Rhodius, Argonautica. George W. Mooney. London. Longmans, Green. 1912. Greek text available at the Perseus Digital Library.
 Callimachus, Callimachus and Lycophron with an English translation by A. W. Mair ; Aratus, with an English translation by G. R. Mair, London: W. Heinemann, New York: G. P. Putnam 1921. Internet Archive
 Callimachus, Works. A.W. Mair. London: William Heinemann; New York: G.P. Putnam's Sons. 1921. Greek text available at the Perseus Digital Library.
 Gaius Julius Hyginus, Astronomica from The Myths of Hyginus translated and edited by Mary Grant. University of Kansas Publications in Humanistic Studies. Online version at the Topos Text Project.
 Gaius Julius Hyginus, Fabulae from The Myths of Hyginus translated and edited by Mary Grant. University of Kansas Publications in Humanistic Studies. Online version at the Topos Text Project.
 Gaius Valerius Flaccus, Argonautica translated by Mozley, J H. Loeb Classical Library Volume 286. Cambridge, MA, Harvard University Press; London, William Heinemann Ltd. 1928. Online version at theio.com.
 Gaius Valerius Flaccus, Argonauticon. Otto Kramer. Leipzig. Teubner. 1913. Latin text available at the Perseus Digital Library.
 Nonnus of Panopolis, Dionysiaca translated by William Henry Denham Rouse (1863-1950), from the Loeb Classical Library, Cambridge, MA, Harvard University Press, 1940.  Online version at the Topos Text Project.
 Nonnus of Panopolis, Dionysiaca. 3 Vols. W.H.D. Rouse. Cambridge, MA., Harvard University Press; London, William Heinemann, Ltd. 1940-1942. Greek text available at the Perseus Digital Library.
 Pausanias, Description of Greece with an English Translation by W.H.S. Jones, Litt.D., and H.A. Ormerod, M.A., in 4 Volumes. Cambridge, MA, Harvard University Press; London, William Heinemann Ltd. 1918. . Online version at the Perseus Digital Library
 Pausanias, Graeciae Descriptio. 3 vols. Leipzig, Teubner. 1903.  Greek text available at the Perseus Digital Library.
Tzetzes, John, Book of Histories, Book VII-VIII translated by Vasiliki Dogani from the original Greek of T. Kiessling's edition of 1826. Online version at theio.com

Oceanids
Children of Atlas
Children of Nilus
Naiads
Maenads
Companions of Dionysus
Queens in Greek mythology
Characters in the Argonautica
Mythology of Argos
Theban mythology
Thessalian mythology